The Southampton Township Schools are a community public school district that serves students in Kindergarten through eighth grade from Southampton Township, New Jersey, United States.

As of the 2018–19 school year, the district, comprising three schools, had an enrollment of 734 students and 70.5 classroom teachers (on an FTE basis), for a student–teacher ratio of 10.4:1.

The district is classified by the New Jersey Department of Education as being in District Factor Group "GH", the third-highest of eight groupings. District Factor Groups organize districts statewide to allow comparison by common socioeconomic characteristics of the local districts. From lowest socioeconomic status to highest, the categories are A, B, CD, DE, FG, GH, I and J.

Public school students from Southampton Township in ninth through twelfth grades attend Seneca High School, which also serves students in ninth through twelfth grade from Shamong Township, Tabernacle Township and Woodland Township. The school is part of the Lenape Regional High School District, which also serves students from Evesham Township, Medford Lakes, Medford Township and Mount Laurel Township. As of the 2018–19 school year, the high school had an enrollment of 1,137 students and 109.5 classroom teachers (on an FTE basis), for a student–teacher ratio of 10.4:1.

Schools
Schools in the district (with 2018–19 enrollment data from the National Center for Education Statistics) are:
Elementary schools
Southampton School #1 with 234 students in grades K-2
Brianna L. Chapin, Principal
Southampton School #2 with 230 students in grades 3-5
Jennifer L. Horner, Principal
Kristine Bertulis, Assistant Principal
Middle school
Southampton School #3 with 254 students in grades 6-8
Jennifer L. Horner, Principal
Kristine Bertulis, Assistant Principal

Administration
Core members of the district's administration are:
Michael L. Harris, Superintendent
Casey DeJoseph, Business Administrator / Board Secretary

Board of education
The district's board of education, with nine members, sets policy and oversees the fiscal and educational operation of the district through its administration. As a Type II school district, the board's trustees are elected directly by voters to serve three-year terms of office on a staggered basis, with three seats up for election each year held (since 2012) as part of the November general election. The board appoints a superintendent to oversee the day-to-day operation of the district.

References

External links
Southampton Township Schools

School Data for the Southampton Township Schools, National Center for Education Statistics
Seneca High School

Southampton Township, New Jersey
New Jersey District Factor Group GH
School districts in Burlington County, New Jersey